Babe London (born Jean Glover, August 28, 1901 – November 29, 1980) was an American actress and comedian, most remembered for her one-time partnership with Oliver Hardy in the 1931 Laurel and Hardy two-reeler Our Wife.

Career
London was born in 1901 in Des Moines, Iowa. Her parents were Dr. David James Glover and Ruth Glover. After the family moved to California, London attended San Diego High School.

London began her screen career as a teenager making her film debut in The Expert Eloper in 1919. She then appeared in A Day's Pleasure, performing opposite Charlie Chaplin. The two played seasick tourists on an excursion boat. She had the role of Rosy Leadbetter in Merely Mary Ann (1920).

London appeared in more than 50 silent films, including The Perfect Flapper, The Boob and the 1928 version of Tillie's Punctured Romance starring W. C. Fields. She worked with many of the funny men of the day, including Harry Langdon and Chester Conklin.

At the height of her career, London weighed 255 pounds. Later, a heart condition necessitated a loss of 100 pounds, and her movie offers declined along with her weight. She never regained her earlier success. Her last most notable role was that of the toothless nurse Nora that Shemp Howard has eyes for in the Three Stooges film Scrambled Brains. Her last film appearance was in 1960's Sex Kittens Go to College.

Later years

In the late 1950s, London began a second career as a painter and devoted the last 20 years of her life to depicting on canvas the early years of Hollywood. She titled the series The Vanishing Era.

Personal life and death
In 1975, London married Hollywood musical director Phil Boutelje. Both were retired and living at the Motion Picture & Television Country House and Hospital in Woodland Hills, California, when they met. They continued to live there until Boutelje died on July 29, 1979. London willed 75 of her paintings to the University of Wyoming's American Heritage Center, along with her personal belongings.

Selected filmography

References

External links
 

1901 births
1980 deaths
American film actresses
American silent film actresses
American television actresses
Actresses from Des Moines, Iowa
20th-century American actresses
San Diego High School alumni